Knidi is a village and a community of the Grevena municipality. Before the 2011 local government reform it was a part of the municipality of Ventzio, of which it was a municipal district and the seat. The 2011 census recorded 264 residents in the village and 610 residents in the community. The community of Knidi covers an area of 81.901 km2.

Administrative division
The community of Knidi consists of five separate settlements: 
Itea (population 133)
Knidi (population 264)
Mikrokleisoura (population 63)
Pistiko (population 50)
Poros (population 100)
The aforementioned population figures are as of 2011.

See also
 List of settlements in the Grevena regional unit

References

Populated places in Grevena (regional unit)